Maggard may refer to:

Maggard, Kentucky, a community in Magoffin County
Dave Maggard (born 1940), American athlete
John "Slo" Maggard, American musician

See also
 Cledus Maggard & the Citizen's Band
 Maggart, a surname